The 2007 Michigan State Spartans football team represented Michigan State University in the 2007 NCAA Division I FBS football season.  Mark Dantonio began his first season as the Spartans' head coach. The Spartans play their home games at Spartan Stadium in East Lansing, Michigan.

Schedule

Game summaries

UAB

Bowling Green

Pittsburgh

Notre Dame

Wisconsin

Northwestern

Indiana

Ohio State

Iowa

Michigan

Purdue

Penn State

    
    
    
    
    
    
    
    
    
    

Devin Thomas 7 Rec, 139 Yds
Kellen Davis 4 Rec, 106 Yds

Boston College (Champs Sports Bowl)

Coaching staff
Mark Dantonio – Head Coach
Don Treadwell – Offenvie Coordinator/Wide Receivers coach
Dave Warner – Quarterbacks coach
Dan Enos – Running backs coach
Mark Staten – Tight ends coach/Recruiting Coordinator
Dan Roushar – Offensive line coach
Pat Narduzzi – Defensive Coordinator
Ted Gill – Defensive line coach
Mike Tressel – Linebackers coach/Special Teams Coordinator
Harlon Barnett – Secondary coach

2008 NFL Draft
The following players were selected in the 2008 NFL Draft.

References

Michigan State
Michigan State Spartans football seasons
Michigan State Spartans football